The first Medium wave radio station in Rome was launched on 6 October 1924 by URI.
The first Shortwave radio station in Rome was launched in 1930 by URI.
After the 8 September 1943 was opened Radio Roma.
The first private radio station in Rome was GBR, launched in 1974 and after Radio Dimensione Suono in 1976.

The following is a list of licensed FM and AM radio stations in the city of Rome, Italy and are sorted by their frequencies.

See also 
List of radio stations in Italy
List of radio stations in Turin
List of radio stations in Naples

Rome
Radio stations
Radio